Tanzaniophasma is a genus of insects in the family Mantophasmatidae. It is a monotypic genus consisting of the species Tanzaniophasma subsolana, which is endemic to Tanzania.

References

Mantophasmatidae
Monotypic insect genera
Insects of Tanzania
Endemic fauna of Tanzania